Karimnagar Police Commissionerate is a city police force with primary responsibilities in law enforcement and investigation within Karimnagar area.

References 

Telangana Police
2016 establishments in Telangana
Government agencies established in 2016
Karimnagar district